is a railway station in the city of Gujō, Gifu Prefecture, Japan, operated by the third sector railway operator Nagaragawa Railway.

Lines

Station layout
Konno Station has one ground-level side platform serving a single bi-directional track. There is no station building but only a weather shelter on then platform. The station is unattended.

Adjacent stations

|-
!colspan=5|Nagaragawa Railway

History
Konno Station was opened on December 11, 1986, the day that operations on the Etsumi-Nan Line were transferred from the Japan National Railway (JNR) to the Nagaragawa Railway.

Surrounding area

Nagara River

See also
 List of Railway Stations in Japan

References

External links

 

Railway stations in Japan opened in 1986
Railway stations in Gifu Prefecture
Stations of Nagaragawa Railway
Gujō, Gifu